The Saturday Night Kid is a 1929 American pre-Code romantic comedy film about two sisters and the man they both want. It stars Clara Bow, Jean Arthur, James Hall, and in her first credited speaking role, Jean Harlow. The film was based on the play Love 'Em and Leave 'Em (1926) by George Abbott and John V. A. Weaver. The movie still survives. The film was preserved by the UCLA Film & Television Archive with funding by Clara Bow biographer David Stenn.

Plot
Set in May 1929, the film focuses on two sisters - Mayme (Clara Bow) and Janie (Jean Arthur) - as they share an apartment in New York City. In the daytime, they work as salesgirls at the Ginsberg's department store, at which Mayme is named to be the star of an upcoming pageant about the "Rise of Ginsberg's" written and directed by supervisor Miss Streeter (Edna May Oliver).  Miss Streeter is unhappy with Mayme who is always late for work and often goofing off.  Janie is named treasurer of the ticket money for the pageant, which will be donated to orphans. Mayme and Bill (James Hall) who is a floorwalker at the store, are sweethearts, but when Bill treats a pretty female customer especially nicely, Mayme is jealous and acts up causing the customer to leave and ruining Bill's sale. Bill and Mayme have words, and Mayme breaks up with him. Mayme's other problem is Janie's selfish and reckless behavior, such as stealing Mayme's clothes, acting sick so Mayme will do her work for her, and ultimately manipulating Bill into asking Janie to a dance, although Bill prefers Mayme over Janie. Janie has gambled away the pageant money with a dishonest neighbor who has cheated Janie; she goes to Mayme for help. Ever the trusting and helpful sister, Mayme tells her to go ahead to the pageant and she will take care of everything. Mayme goes to the crooked neighbor who took Janie's pageant money and gets the money back. Janie, in the mean time, goes to the pageant and nervously confesses the money is gone, but allows Miss Streeter to believe that Mayme is the one who stole and gambled the money away. Bill overhears this and sells his radio so he can cover the lost money. When Mayme shows up with the money, Bill tries to give her his money. She is horrified that Bill thinks she has stolen and gambled away the money. Ms. Streeter vows to have Mayme prosecuted and fired. Back at the apartment, Mayme and Janie, who is trying to leave with a suitcase, have words. Bill overhears Janie confess that she is the one who stole the money. Feeling like a fool he pursues Mayme and begs her to forgive him and marry him.

Cast
Clara Bow as Mayme
Jean Arthur as Janie
James Hall as William 'Bill' Taylor
 Edna May Oliver as Miss Streeter
Hyman Meyer as Ginsberg
 Charles Sellon as Lem Woodruff
 Ethel Wales as Lily Woodruff
 Jean Harlow as Hazel
 Leone Lane as Pearl

External links 

 
 
 

1929 films
1929 romantic comedy films
1920s English-language films
American black-and-white films
American films based on plays
American romantic comedy films
Films directed by A. Edward Sutherland
Films scored by John Leipold
Films set in department stores
Films set in New York City
Films set in the 1920s
Paramount Pictures films
1920s American films